Arthur Grant was an American Negro league catcher in the 1920s.

Grant played for the Richmond Giants in 1922. In seven recorded games, he posted three hits in 26 plate appearances.

References

External links
Baseball statistics and player information from Baseball-Reference Black Baseball Stats and Seamheads

Year of birth missing
Year of death missing
Place of birth missing
Place of death missing
Richmond Giants players